"Of Heaven Considered as a Tomb" is a poem from Wallace Stevens's first book of poetry, Harmonium (1923). It was first published in 1921, so it is in the public domain.

This is a poem about the other side of death, optimistically hallooing the departed ("the darkened ghosts") for news that they are still "about and still about", pessimistically anticipating that the burials that occur each day are a portal into nothingness, "the one abysmal night". It may be compared with "The Worms at Heaven's Gate", which presents death more naturalistically.

That interpretation plays a language game, but not the one Stevens invites readers to play by asking "What word have you, interpreters...?"

Notes 

1921 poems
American poems
Poetry by Wallace Stevens